This page are listed the results of all of the Rio Carnival on year 2011.

Grupo Especial

Grupo A

Grupo B

Grupo C

Grupo D

Grupo E

References 

2011